Hans Heinrich Pfeiffer, (born 1896) was a German botanist and physiologist, with a particular interest in spermatophytes.

(Discussion on JSTOR gives 1896 as his birth year and 1970 as his death year, as does the Russian Wikipedia article. This conflicts with IPNI which gives his birth year as 1890.)

Some published names
(incomplete list)
Cyperaceae Androtrichum giganteum (Kunth) H.Pfeiff. Revista Sudamer. Bot. 6: 185. 1940 
Cyperaceae Androtrichum trigynum (Spreng.) H.Pfeiff.  Repert. Spec. Nov. Regni Veg. 42: 10. 1937
Cyperaceae Becquerelia bicolor H.Pfeiff. Repert. Spec. Nov. Regni Veg. 18: 381. 1922
Cyperaceae Becquerelia bicolor H.Pfeiff. Repert. Spec. Nov. Regni Veg. 18: 381. 1922
Cyperaceae Becquerelia bicolor f. humilis H.Pfeiff. Repert. Spec. Nov. Regni Veg. 18: 382. 1922 
Cyperaceae Becquerelia bicolor f. ramosissima H.Pfeiff. Repert. Spec. Nov. Regni Veg. 18: 382. 1922
Cyperaceae Becquerelia bicolor f. verticillata H.Pfeiff. Repert. Spec. Nov. Regni Veg. 18: 382. 1922
Cyperaceae Becquerelia bullata C.B.Clarke & H.Pfeiff. Repert. Spec. Nov. Regni Veg. 18: 382. 1922

(These may not be accepted names.)

Some publications 
 1938. Submikroskopische Morphologie des Protoplasmas, 73 Gebr. Borntraeger, Berlín
 1940. Experimentelle Cytologie, 35 et seq. Chron. Bot. Co. Leyden
 1948. Kolloid-Z. Z. Naturforsch. 1 : 461
 1948.  Birefringence and Orientation-Rate of the Leptones of Protoplasm. Nature 162 : 419-420. 
 1958. Kuster, E; Pfeiffer, H.H.   Osmotischer wert, Saugkraft, turgor. Ed. Vienna : Springer-Verlag. 7 pp.

Books 
 Huss, W; Pfeiffer, H.H. (1948). Zellkern und Vererbung (Núcleos celulares y características). Ed. Schwab. 160 pp.
 Pfeiffer, H.H. (1949). Das Polarisationsmikroskop als Messinstrument in Biologie und Medizin (The polarizing microscope as a measuring instrument in biology and medicine). Ed. Vieweg. 94 pp.
 ----- (1940). Experimentelle cytologie. Ed. F.Verdoorn, vol. 4. 240 pp. 28 il.
(taken from :es:Hans Heinrich Pfeiffer)

References 

20th-century German botanists
1896 births
1970 deaths